Moulana Abdul Akbar Chitrali is a Pakistani politician who has been a member of the National Assembly of Pakistan, since August 2018.

Political career
He was elected to the National Assembly as a candidate of MMA (a coalition of Jumat-e-Islami and Jamiat-e-Ulema F) from Constituency NA-1 (Chitral) in 2018 Pakistani general election. He received 48,616 votes and defeated Abdul Latif, a candidate of Pakistan Tehreek-e-Insaf (PTI). Earlier to this, He has also served Chitral District of KP as MNA in Gen (R) Musharraf led government back in 2002.

On May 17, 2021, Chitrali appeared to call for the use of nuclear weapons against Israel and, potentially, India, asking: "when will this atomic power be useful? Will we use these missiles as toys? To show our kids? Or will we keep these missiles and this atom bomb in some museum, so that we will be able to say [in the future] that at a certain era we had managed to acquire nuclear power?"

Electoral history

2002

2013

2018

References

Living people
Pakistani MNAs 2018–2023
Muttahida Majlis-e-Amal MNAs
Year of birth missing (living people)
People from Chitral District